Time Busters is a British children's television series created by Tim Child and the same producers of Knightmare. It was first shown on BBC2 from 17 January 1993 to 22 January 1995. The first two series were hosted by Michael Troughton, with assistance from Buster - the on-board computer. For Series 3, Buster hosted 'himself'.

Format
Each run of the game involves a team of children taking a 'time-travelling' bus that drove you to a historical reenactment. The children would be involved in a quest to find a Time-Capsule. This challenge would be a race against the clock to succeed and each episode would result in the team being successful, or having to abandon their attempt due to running out of time. Regardless the episode would conclude in the children quickly returning to the bus before it disappeared from that era.

Transmissions

References

External links
 

1993 British television series debuts
1995 British television series endings
1990s British children's television series
1990s British game shows
BBC children's television shows
English-language television shows